Sheriffdeen Adewale Tella is a Nigerian academic economist and professor of economics at the Olabisi Onabanjo University - and is also a frequent economic commentator in the Nigerian daily newspapers.

He worked as Vice-Chancellor at Crescent University until his controversial letter to Ogun State House of Assembly preventing State government from borrowing and eventual resignation in December 2010. He also lectured Economics at Babcock University. Tella specialises in monetary, development economics and banking & finance especially the nexus between the banking system and the Nigerian economy.

Education
Tella obtained a Bachelor's and MSc from the University of Benin and University of Ibadan respectively. He proceeded to the United States where he obtained a doctorate in economics as a Fulbright Scholar from the University of Nebraska, Lincoln.

Academic career
Tella has lectured at OOU in economics since the late 1980s and became a professor in 2005.

Tella has in the past co-authored reports for the Overseas Development Institute mainly on financial access within African countries, especially Nigeria. He currently chairs the Centre for Continuing Education at OOU.

He took a leave from OOU to work as the Vice-Chancellor of Crescent University, a private university with ties to Nigeria's ex-Foreign Minister, Prince Bola Ajibola, from July 2009 to December 2010. It was alleged that his criticism of the economic policies of then Ogun State governor, Otunba Gbenga Daniel, contributed to his ouster from Crescent.

Selected publications

Journal articles

References

Nigerian economists
Nigerian social scientists
Academic staff of Olabisi Onabanjo University
University of Ibadan alumni
University of Benin (Nigeria) alumni
University of Nebraska–Lincoln alumni
Living people
Year of birth missing (living people)
Vice-Chancellors of Nigerian universities
Academic staff of Babcock University